The 2014 Newham London Borough Council election took place on 22 May 2014 to elect members of Newham London Borough Council in England. This was on the same day as other local elections.

Summary results
Labour won all 60 seats, as it did in 2010.

|}

Background
A total of 208 candidates stood in the election for the 60 seats being contested across 20 wards. Candidates included a full slate from the Labour party (as had been the case at every election since the borough council had been formed in 1964), whilst the Conservative party also ran a full slate and the Liberal Democrats ran 11 candidates. Other candidates running were 55 Christian Peoples Alliance, 8 TUSC, 7 UKIP, 1 Communities United Party, 2 Green, 1 Communist Party and 3 Independents.

Ward results

Beckton

Boleyn

Canning Town North

Canning Town South

Custom House

East Ham Central

East Ham North

East Ham South

Forest Gate North

Forest Gate South

Green Street East

Green Street West

Little Ilford

Manor Park

Plaistow North

Plaistow South

Royal Docks

Stratford and New Town

Wall End

West Ham

By-elections between 2014 and 2018

Beckton

The by-election was called following the death of Cllr Alec Kellaway.

Stratford and New Town

The by-election was called following the disqualification due to non-attendance of Cllr Charlene McLean. The election was held on the same day as the 2015 general election.

Boleyn

 

The by-election was called following the death of Cllr Charity Fibresima

Forest Gate North

  

The by-election was called following the resignation of Councillor Ellie Robinson to accept a job with the Mayor of London, Sadiq Khan.

References

Newham
2014